Brigadeiro Lysias Augusto Rodrigues Airport  is the airport serving Carolina, Brazil. It is named after Brigadier Lysias Augusto Rodrigues (1896-1957), one of the founding figures of the Brazilian Air Force, and expert in Geopolitics.

Airlines and destinations
No scheduled flights operate at this airport.

Access

See also

List of airports in Brazil

References

External links

Airports in Maranhão